Al-Hallaj or Mansour Hallaj ( 26 March  922) (Hijri  309 AH) was a Persian mystic, poet, and teacher of Sufism. He is best known for his saying: "I am the Truth" (Ana'l-Ḥaqq), which many saw as a claim to divinity, while others interpreted it as an instance of annihilation of the ego, allowing God to speak through him. Al-Hallaj gained a wide following as a preacher before he became implicated in power struggles of the Abbasid court and was executed after a long period of confinement on religious and political charges. Although most of his Sufi contemporaries disapproved of his actions, Hallaj later became a major figure in the Sufi tradition.

Life

Early years 
Al-Hallaj was born around 858 in Pars Province of the Abbasid Empire to a cotton-carder (Hallaj means "cotton-carder" in Arabic) in an Arabized town called al-Bayḍā'. His grandfather was a Zoroastrian magus. His father moved to a town in Wasit famous for its school of Quran reciters. Al-Hallaj memorized the Qur'an before he was 12 years old and would often retreat from worldly pursuits to join other mystics in study at the school of Sahl al-Tustari. During this period al-Hallaj lost his ability to speak Persian and later wrote exclusively in Arabic. Al-Hallaj was a Sunni Muslim.

When he was twenty, al-Hallaj moved to Basra, where he married and received his Sufi habit from 'Amr Makkī, although his lifelong and monogamous marriage later provoked jealousy and opposition from the latter. Through his brother-in-law, al-Hallaj found himself in contact with a  Zaydi Shi'i clan that supported the Zanj Rebellion.

Al-Hallaj later went to Baghdad to consult the famous Sufi teacher Junayd of Baghdad, but he was tired of the conflict that existed between his father-in-law and 'Amr Makkī and he set out on a pilgrimage to Mecca, against the advice of Junayd, as soon as the Zanj Rebellion was crushed.

Pilgrimages and travels 

In Mecca he made a vow to remain for one year in the courtyard of the sanctuary in fasting and total silence. When he returned from Mecca, he laid down the Sufi tunic and adopted a "lay habit" in order to be able to preach more freely. At that time a number of Sunnis, including former Christians who would later become viziers at the Abbasid court, became his disciples, but other Sufis were scandalized, while some Muʿtazilis and Shias who held high posts in the government accused him of deception and incited the mob against him. Al-Hallaj left for eastern Iran and remained there for five years, preaching in the Arab colonies and fortified monasteries that housed volunteer fighters in the jihad, after which he was able to return and install his family in Baghdad.

Al-Hallaj made his second pilgrimage to Mecca with four hundred disciples, where some Sufis, his former friends, accused him of sorcery and making a pact with the jinn. Afterwards he set out on a long voyage that took him to India and Turkestan beyond the frontiers of Islamic lands. About 290/902 he returned to Mecca for his final pilgrimage clad in an Indian loin-cloth and a patched garment over his shoulders. There he prayed to God to be made despised and rejected, so that God alone might grant grace to Himself through His servant's lips.

Imprisonment and execution

After returning to his family in Baghdad, al-Hallaj began making proclamations that aroused popular emotion and caused anxiety among the educated classes. These included avowing his burning love of God and his desire to "die accursed for the Community", and statements such as "O Muslims, save me from God" ... "God has made my blood lawful to you: kill me". It was at that time that al-Hallaj is said to have pronounced his famous shath "I am the Truth". He was denounced at the court, but a Shafi'i jurist refused to condemn him, stating that spiritual inspiration was beyond his jurisdiction.

Al-Hallaj's preaching had by now inspired a movement for moral and political reform in Baghdad. In 296/908 Sunni reformers made an unsuccessful attempt to depose the underage caliph al-Muqtadir. When he was restored, his Shi'i vizier unleashed anti-Hanbali repressions which prompted al-Hallaj to flee Baghdad, but three years later he was arrested, brought back, and put in prison, where he remained for nine years.

The conditions of al-Hallaj's confinement varied depending on the relative sway his opponents and supporters held at the court, but he was finally condemned to death in 922 on the charge of being a Qarmatian rebel who wished to destroy the Kaaba, because he had said "the important thing is to proceed seven times around the Kaaba of one's heart." According to another report, the pretext was his recommendation to build local replicas of the Kaaba for those who are unable to make the pilgrimage to Mecca. The queen-mother interceded with the caliph who initially revoked the execution order, but the intrigues of the vizier finally moved him to approve it. On 23 Dhu 'l-Qa'da (25 March) trumpets announced his execution the next day. The words he spoke during the last night in his cell are collected in Akhbar al-Hallaj.  Thousands of people witnessed his execution on the banks of the Tigris River. He was first punched in the face by his executioner, then lashed until unconscious, and then decapitated or hanged. Witnesses reported that al-Hallaj's last words under torture were "all that matters for the ecstatic is that the Unique should reduce him to Unity", after which he recited the Quranic verse 42:18. His body was doused in oil and set alight, and his ashes were then scattered into the river. A cenotaph was "quickly" built on the site of his execution, and "drew pilgrims for a millennium" until being swept away by a Tigris flood during the 1920s.

Some question whether al-Hallaj was executed for religious reasons as has been commonly assumed. According to Carl W. Ernst, the legal notion of blasphemy was not clearly defined in Islamic law and statements of this kind were treated inconsistently by legal authorities. In practice, since apostasy was subsumed under the category of zandaqa, which reflected the Zoroastrian legacy of viewing heresy as a political crime, they were prosecuted only when it was politically convenient. Sadakat Kadri points out that "it was far from conventional to punish heresy in the tenth century," and it is thought he would have been spared execution except that the vizier of caliph al-Muqtadir wished to discredit "certain figures who had associated themselves" with al-Hallaj. (Previously al-Hallaj had been punished for talking about being at one with God by being shaved, pilloried and beaten with the flat of a sword, not executed because the Shafi'ite judge had ruled that his words were not "proof of disbelief.")

Teachings and practices 
Al-Hallaj addressed himself to popular audiences encouraging them to find God inside their own souls, which earned him the title of "the carder of innermost souls" (ḥallāj al-asrār). He preached without the traditional Sufi habit and used language familiar to the local Shi'i population. This may have given the impression that he was a Qarmatian missionary rather than a Sufi. His prayer to God to make him lost and despised can be regarded as typical for a Sufi seeking annihilation in God, although Louis Massignon has interpreted it as an expression of a desire to sacrifice himself as atonement on behalf of all Muslims. When al-Hallaj returned to Baghdad from his last pilgrimage to Mecca, he built a model of the Kaaba in his home for private worship.

Al-Hallaj was popularly credited with numerous supernatural acts. He was said to have "lit four hundred oil lamps in Jerusalem's Church of the Holy Sepulchre with his finger and extinguished an eternal flame in a Zoroastrian fire temple with the tug of a sleeve." 

Among other Sufis, al-Hallaj was an anomaly. Many Sufi masters felt that it was inappropriate to share mysticism with the masses, yet al-Hallaj openly did so in his writings and through his teachings. This was exacerbated by occasions when he would fall into trances which he attributed to being in the presence of God.

Hallaj was also accused of ḥulūl "incarnationism", the basis of which charge seems to be a disputed verse in which the author proclaims mystical union in terms of two spirits in one body. This position was criticized for not affirming union and unity strongly enough; there are two spirits left whereas the Sufi fana' texts speak of utter annihilation and annihilation in annihilation (the annihilation of the consciousness of annihilation), with only one actor, the deity, left. Saer El-Jaichi has argued "that in speaking of the unity with the divine in terms of ḥulūl, Hallaj does not mean the fusion (or, mingling) of the divine and human substances." Rather, he has in mind "a heightened sense of awareness that culminates in the fulfillment of a spiritual – super-sensory – vision of God’s presence."

Edward Said succinctly described al-Hallaj as "quasi-Christlike."

There are conflicting reports about his most famous shaṭḥ,  Anā l-Ḥaqq "I am The Truth, " which was taken to mean that he was claiming to be God, since al-Ḥaqq "the Truth" is one of the names of God in Islam. While meditating, he uttered  The earliest report, coming from a hostile account of Basra grammarians, states that he said it in the mosque of al-Mansur, while testimonies that emerged decades later claimed that it was said in private during consultations with Junayd Baghdadi. Even though this utterance has become inseparably associated with his execution in the popular imagination, owing in part to its inclusion in his biography by Attar of Nishapur, the historical issues surrounding his execution are far more complex. In another controversial statement, al-Hallaj claimed "There is nothing wrapped in my turban but God, " and similarly he would point to his cloak and say,  Mā fī jubbatī illā l-Lāh "There is nothing in my cloak but God." He also wrote:

In the 11th volume of Ibn Kathir's book al-Bidaya wa-l-Nihaya, it is said that al-Hallaj used to deceive people by putting on plays with his hired men under the guise of spiritual healing, and extorting money from them by cunning and secret, and  it is also stated that,  he came to India to learn and practice Indian magic. Ibn Kathir also said in the book, "Abu Abd al-Rahman al-Sulami Amr ibn Uthman (son of Uthman ibn Affan) said on the authority of al-Makki: He said: "I was walking with al-Hallaj in some streets of Makkah and I read the Qur'an.  I was reciting, and he heard my recitation. And said: I can recite the same (recitation), so I left him". Narrated by Ibn Kathir, Abu Zari al-Tabari said, I heard Abu Ya'qub al-Aqta say: I gave my daughter in marriage to al-Husayn al-Hallaj when I saw his good conduct and diligence, and after a short time it became clear to me that  He is a deceitful sorcerer, a hateful infidel. Ibn Kathir also said, "Muhammad ibn Yahya al-Razi said: I heard Amr ibn Uthman cursing him and saying: If I could have killed him, I would have killed him with my own hands. I said to him: What did the Shaykh get on him? He  Said: "I read a verse of the Book of Allah and He said: I can compose like it and speak like it." Ibn Kathir also said, and Abu al-Qasim al-Qushayri mentioned in his letter in the chapter on preserving the hearts of the sheikhs: Amr bin Uthman entered the house of al-Hallaj when he was in Makkah, he (Hallaj) was writing something on paper and he (Amr) said to him  : What is it?  He (Hallaj) said: It is against the Qur'an. He said: Then he prayed for him and then he was not successful. Hallaj denied that Abu Ya'qub al-Aqta married him to his daughter.

Works 
Al-Hallaj's principal works, all written in Arabic, included:

 Twenty-seven Riwāyāt (stories or narratives) collected by his disciples in about 290/902.
 Kitāb al-Tawāsīn, a series of eleven short works.
 Poems collected in Dīwān al-Hallāj.
 Pronouncements including those of his last night collected in Akhbār al-Hallāj.

His best known written work is the Book of al-Tawasin, in which he used line diagrams and symbols to help him convey mystical experiences that he could not express in words. Ṭawāsīn is the broken plural of the word ṭā-sīn which spells out the letters  ṭā (ط) and sīn (س) placed for unknown reasons at the start of some surahs in the Quran. The chapters vary in length and subject. Chapter 1 is an homage to the Prophet Muhammad, for example, while Chapters 4 and 5 are treatments of the Prophet's heavenly ascent to Mi'raj. Chapter 6 is the longest of the chapters and is devoted to a dialogue of Satan (Iblis) and God, where Satan refuses to bow to Adam, although God asks him to do so. Satan's monotheistic claim—that he refused to bow before any other than God even at the risk of eternal rejection and torment—is combined with the lyrical language of the love-mad lover from the Majnun tradition, the lover whose loyalty is so total that there is no path for him to any "other than" the beloved. This passage explores the issues of mystical knowledge (ma'rifa) when it contradicts God's commands for although Iblis was disobeying God's commands, he was following God's will. His refusal is due, others argue, to a misconceived idea of God's uniqueness and because of his refusal to abandon himself to God in love. Hallaj criticizes the staleness of his adoration (Mason, 51-3). Al-Hallaj stated in this book:

Classical era views

Few figures in Islam provoked as much debate among classical commentators as al-Hallaj. The controversy cut across doctrinal categories. In virtually every major current of juridical and theological thought (Jafari, Maliki, Hanbali, Hanafi, Shafi'i, Ash'ari, and Maturidi) one finds his detractors and others who accepted his legacy completely or justified his statements with some excuse. His admirers among philosophers included Ibn Tufayl, Suhrawardi, and Mulla Sadra.

Although the majority of early Sufi teachers condemned him, he was almost unanimously canonized by later generations of Sufis. The principal Sufi interpretation of the shathiyat which took the form of "I am" sayings contrasted the permanence (baqā) of God  with the mystical annihilation (fanā) of the individual ego, which made it possible for God to speak through the individual. Some Sufi authors claimed that such utterances were misquotations or attributed them to immaturity, madness or intoxication, while others regarded them as authentic expressions of spiritual states, even profoundest experience of divine realities, which should not be manifested to the unworthy. Some of them, including al-Ghazali, showed ambivalence about their apparently blasphemous nature while admiring the spiritual status of their authors. Rumi wrote: "When the pen (of authority) is in the hand of a traitor, unquestionably Mansur is on a gibbet"

Modern views 
The supporters of Mansur have interpreted his statement as meaning, "God has emptied me of everything but Himself. " According to them, Mansur never denied God's oneness and was a strict monotheist. However, he believed that the actions of man, when performed in total accordance with God's pleasure, lead to a blissful unification with Him. Malayalam author Vaikom Muhammad Basheer draws parallel between "Anā al-Ḥaqq" and Aham Brahmasmi, the Upanishad Mahāvākya which means 'I am Brahman' (the Ultimate Reality in Hinduism). Basheer uses this term to intend God is found within one's 'self'. There was a belief among European historians that al-Hallaj was secretly a Christian, until the French scholar Louis Massignon presented his legacy in the context of Islamic mysticism in his four-volume work La Passion de Husayn ibn Mansûr Hallâj.

Influence 
Hallaj is highly revered by Yezidis, who composed a few religious hymns devoted to him. Elements of his views expressed in Kitab al-Tawasin can be found in their religion.

Inheritance
 Ashraf Ali Thanvi wrote the biography of Mansoor Hallaj in "Seerate Mansoor Hallaj", which was later compiled into a book by Thanvi's student Zafar Ahmad Usmani.

See also 
 Arabic literature
 List of Persian poets and authors
 Sufism
 Hasan of Basra
 Rabi'a al-'Adawiyya
 Aham Brahmasmi
 Anal Haq

References 

Rodziewicz, Artur (2022). The Mystery of Essence and the Essence of Mystery: Yezidi and Yaresan Cosmogonies in the Light of the Kitab al-Tawasin Macmillan. ISBN 978-981-16-6444-1.

Further reading

External links 

In English:
   The Tawasin of Mansur al-Hallaj in English translation]
 Selected poetry by al-Hallaj in English translation
 Doctrine of Al-Hallaj by Al-Qushayri
 Articles at Poet Seers
 al-Hallaj at the Internet Medieval Source Book

In other languages:
 Rhythmic prose and poetry by Al-Hallaj recited in Arabic
 Kitâb al tawâsîn edited and annotated by Louis Massignon (in Arabic and French) (includes Persian translation and commentary by Ruzbihan Baqli).
 Louis Massignon (1922) La passion d'Al Hosayn-ibn-Mansour al-Hallaj, vol. 2 (in French)
 Akhbar al-Hallaj (in Arabic)
 Collected Works of Mansur Hallaj in Persian translation 
 Diwan of Mansur Hallaj in Persian translation 
 Diwan of Mansur Hallaj in Urdu Translation 

850s births
922 deaths
Year of birth uncertain
9th-century Arabic writers
Persian Arabic-language poets
People executed for blasphemy
People executed for heresy
Executed Iranian people
Iranian Sufi saints
Sufi poets
10th-century executions by the Abbasid Caliphate
People from Fars Province
10th-century Iranian writers
9th-century Iranian writers
Iranian Muslim mystics
Executed philosophers